1I may refer to:
1i Productions, an American board game publisher
SSH 1I (WA), part of which became Washington State Route 525
1I/2017 U1 (ʻOumuamua), abbreviated 1I, the first observed interstellar object passing through the Solar System.
 One eye

See also
CACNA1I
I1 (disambiguation)